Your Honor is an American drama television series starring Bryan Cranston, adapted from the Israeli TV series Kvodo. It premiered on Showtime on December 6, 2020 and ended on March 19, 2023. While ordered as a miniseries, in August 2021, the series was renewed for a second season which premiered on January 15, 2023. In July 2022, it was reported that the second season would be its last.

Premise
Season 1: Michael Desiato is a prominent and respected New Orleans judge. When his teenage son Adam kills another teenager in an accidental hit-and-run collision, Michael encourages his son to turn himself in, but quickly changes his mind when he discovers that the boy who his son hit was the son of a mob kingpin. Michael decides to protect his son which ignites a dangerous game filled with hiding, lies, secret keeping, and very difficult choices and leaves behind tragic and fatal consequences.

Season 2: After the death of his son, Michael is let out of prison early to finally put an end to the mob that has ruined many New Orlean citizen’s lives and many others. Concurrently, an enemy of the mob, a drug cartel gang, known as the Desire Gang, make their move. Meanwhile, the death of Adam impacts those close to him as truth begins to spread. Michael is forced to make risky decisions as he becomes an undercover agent spying on the mob while also finding the culprit(s) behind the death of his wife. Past consequences intrude, leading Michael down a dangerous rabbit hole with bad outcomes every which way.

Cast and characters

Main

 Bryan Cranston as Michael Desiato, a New Orleans judge, willing to do anything to protect his son
 Hunter Doohan as Adam Desiato (season 1), Michael's son who is involved in a hit and run that resulted in the death of the son of the head of an organized crime family in New Orleans.
 Hope Davis as Gina Baxter, the ruthless wife of a New Orleans mob boss and the mother of the boy whom Adam killed
 Sofia Black-D'Elia as Frannie Latimer (season 1), Adam's love interest and teacher who knows his secret
 Isiah Whitlock Jr. as Charlie Figaro, a politician with connections to organized crime and Michael's best friend
 Michael Stuhlbarg as Jimmy Baxter, the boss of an organized crime family, Gina's husband and the father of the boy whom Adam killed
 Carmen Ejogo as Lee Delamere (season 1; recurring season 2), Michael's former protégé and a lawyer whom he convinces to take Kofi's case
 Andrene Ward-Hammond as "Big Mo" (season 2; recurring season 1), the leader of Desire, a criminal gang in the Lower Ninth Ward
 Keith Machekanyanga as Trey "Little Mo" Monroe (season 2; recurring season 1), Big Mo's right-hand man
 Benjamin Flores Jr. as Eugene Jones (season 2; recurring season 1), the younger brother of Kofi Jones and a member of Desire
 Lilli Kay as Sofia "Fia" Baxter (season 2; recurring season 1), Gina and Jimmy's daughter who becomes Adam's girlfriend unaware that Adam killed her brother Rocco
 Jimi Stanton as Carlo Baxter (season 2; recurring season 1), Gina and Jimmy's eldest son, who was released from Angola Prison after Adam killed his brother Rocco

Special guest stars
 Margo Martindale as Elizabeth Guthrie, a state senator, Michael's mother-in-law and Adam's maternal grandmother
 Maura Tierney as Fiona McKee (season 1), a prosecutor at the same courthouse where Michael works
 Rosie Perez as Olivia Delmont (season 2), an assistant U.S Attorney for the Eastern District of Louisiana

Recurring
 Amy Landecker as Nancy Costello, a detective Michael turns to for help
 Tony Curran as Frankie, an associate of Jimmy's criminal organization
 Lamar Johnson as Kofi Jones (season 1), a young man who was forced by Little Mo to take the fall for Adam's hit and run
 Chet Hanks as Joey Maldini, Carlo's best friend who also works for Jimmy
 David Maldonado as Lieutenant Brendan Cusack, a corrupt NOPD officer with ties to Jimmy, the Desire gang and Charlie
 Melanie Nicholls-King as "Female" Jones (season 1), Kofi and Eugene's mother
 Sampley Barinaga as Wesley (season 1), Adam's best friend
 Lorraine Toussaint as Judge Sara LeBlanc (season 1), the chief justice at the same courthouse where Michael works
 Mark Margolis as Carmine Conti (season 2), Gina's father
 Mark O'Brien as Father Jay (season 2), the Roman Catholic priest of the Baxter family
 Ciara Renee as Janelle (season 2), Big Mo's love interest who is a singer

Episodes

Series overview

Season 1 (2020–21)

Season 2 (2023)

Production
The series was first announced as being developed by CBS Studios in August 2017, with a series commitment in October 2017. Bryan Cranston was announced to headline the series in late January 2019. In August 2019, Michael Stuhlbarg, Sofia Black-D'Elia, Carmen Ejogo and Isiah Whitlock Jr. were added to the cast. In September 2019, Hope Davis was cast in a leading capacity, with Lilli Kay and Amy Landecker joining in a recurring role. Tony Curran, Keith Machekanyanga, Lamar Johnson and Benjamin Flores, Jr. were added in October 2019, with Margo Martindale joining in December 2019. In October 2020, Maura Tierney joined the cast in a recurring role.

Principal photography for the series began on September 16, 2019, in New Orleans, Louisiana, but was suspended in March 2020 due to the COVID-19 pandemic. Production resumed on October 7, 2020, and concluded on November 25, 2020. The series premiered on December 6, 2020 on Showtime.

On August 24, 2021, Showtime renewed the series for a second season. On July 5, 2022, it was reported that Cranston said that the second season will be its final season on Dax Shepard's Armchair Expert podcast. On the same day, it was also announced that filming for the second season has begun, and that Joey Hartstone is the new showrunner with Keith Machekanyanga promoted as a series regular for the second season. The following week, it was reported that Rosie Perez was cast in a recurring role while Andrene Ward-Hammond was promoted to as a series regular for the second season. On August 1, 2022, Jimi Stanton, Kay, and Flores were promoted as series regulars for the second season. On October 11, 2022, Mark Margolis and Mark O'Brien joined the cast in recurring capacities for the second season.

Filming for the second season began on July 18, 2022 and is scheduled to conclude on December 16, 2022 in New Orleans, Louisiana. The second season premiered on January 15, 2023 on Showtime.

Reception

Critical response
For the first season, review aggregator Rotten Tomatoes reported an approval rating of 50% based on 50 critic reviews, with an average rating of 6.1/10. The website's critics consensus reads, "Bryan Cranston is powerful as yet another father with nothing to lose, but Your Honor too closely resembles other, better shows about good men doing bad things to warrant its relentlessly grim proceedings." Metacritic gave the first season a weighted average score of 60 out of 100 based on 29 critic reviews, indicating "mixed or average reviews".

On Rotten Tomatoes, the second season has an approval rating of 67% based 6 critic reviews, with an average rating of 6.5/10.

Ratings

Season 1

Season 2

Notes

References

External links

2020 American television series debuts
2023 American television series endings
2020s American crime drama television series
2020s American legal television series
American television series based on Israeli television series
American thriller television series
English-language television shows
Showtime (TV network) original programming
Television productions suspended due to the COVID-19 pandemic
Television series by CBS Studios
Television shows filmed in New Orleans
Television shows set in New Orleans
Works about the American Mafia
Works about corruption
Television series about lawyers